Francisco Javier Raya Buenache (born 20 April 1991) is a Spanish figure skater. He is the 2011 Spanish national senior champion and has competed in the free skate at eight ISU Championships.

Personal life
Francisco Javier Raya Buenache was born on 20 April 1991 in Madrid. He studied ballet from the age of six until he was 17. He is studying audiovisual communication at the Complutense University of Madrid. Raya is openly gay.

Career 
Raya began skating in 1998 at a rink near Madrid's Chamartín railway station. His first coach was Jocelyn Flanagan. He is now coached by Carolina Sanz and Jordi Lafarga in Madrid and spends some time training in Canada during the summer. He has worked with Daniela Slovak in Calgary, Manon Perron in Montreal, and Brian Orser in Toronto.

Raya made his European debut in 2011, finishing 19th. He sustained a leg injury before the 2011 Nebelhorn Trophy but recovered in November. He withdrew from the 2012 Spanish Championships due to illness, and later missed the 2012 Europeans but competed at the 2012 Worlds, where he finished 24th.

Raya competed at the 2014 Winter Olympics in Sochi and placed 25th. He withdrew from the 2014 World Championships due to an injury of the adductor in his left foot. At the 2015 European Championships in Stockholm, he placed 21st in the short program, 14th in the free skate, and 14th overall.

Programs

Results 
CS: Challenger Series; JGP: Junior Grand Prix

References

External links 

 
 

Living people
Spanish male single skaters
1991 births
Sportspeople from Madrid
LGBT figure skaters
Gay sportsmen
Spanish LGBT sportspeople
Olympic figure skaters of Spain
Figure skaters at the 2014 Winter Olympics
Complutense University of Madrid alumni
Competitors at the 2015 Winter Universiade
Competitors at the 2013 Winter Universiade
Competitors at the 2011 Winter Universiade